South Alloa railway station, located south of the River Forth, served the village of South Alloa, Scotland and the town of Alloa via a ferry link from 1850 to 1885.

History 
The station was opened on 2 September 1850 as Alloa by the Scottish Central Railway (SCR) as the northern terminus of a branch from their  to Stirling main line.

In 1860 the station consisted of a small building with one platform on a run-around loop, there were several sidings and a goods shed, close by to the west was a connection to some coke ovens.

At the time of opening the station the SCR took over the running of the ferry and it was reported to be a great benefit until the Stirling and Dunfermline Railway's  to  line opened in 1852.

The station's name was changed to South Alloa in 1854 to avoid confusion with the North British Railway station.

By 1895 there were a lot of sidings to the west of the station servicing a timber depot. The line closed to goods on 1 September 1950.

References

External links

Disused railway stations in Falkirk (council area)
Former Caledonian Railway stations
Railway stations in Great Britain opened in 1854
Railway stations in Great Britain closed in 1885
1854 establishments in Scotland
1950 disestablishments in Scotland